Allana College of Architecture was established in 1999, by the M.C.E. Society.  The college is approved by the All India Council of Technical Education (AICTE), Council of Architecture India (New Delhi), Director of Technical Education, and is affiliated to University of Pune. The college is also a member of the National Association of Students of Architecture (NASA). The college imparts education leading to five year Bachelor Degree Course in Architecture.

References

External links
 Official Website - Allana College of Architecture

Architecture schools in India
Universities and colleges in Maharashtra
Colleges affiliated to Savitribai Phule Pune University
Educational institutions established in 1999
1999 establishments in Maharashtra